The 1927 Iowa State Cyclones football team represented Iowa State College of Agricultural and Mechanic Arts (later renamed Iowa State University) in the Missouri Valley Conference during the 1927 college football season. In their second season under head coach C. Noel Workman, the Cyclones compiled a 4–3–1 record (3–2 against conference opponents), finished in fourth place in the conference, and were outscored by opponents by a combined total of 78 to 77. They played their home games at State Field in Ames, Iowa.

Walter Weiss was the team captain. Harry Lindblom was selected as a first-team all-conference player. The Cyclones garnered a 12-12 tie against 1927 national co-champion Illinois.

Schedule

References

Iowa State
Iowa State Cyclones football seasons
Iowa State Cyclones football